The year 1966 in science and technology involved some significant events, listed below.

Astronomy and space exploration
 February 3 – The unmanned Soviet Luna 9 spacecraft makes the first controlled  rocket-assisted landing on the Moon.
 March 1 – Venera 3 Soviet space probe crashes on Venus becoming the first spacecraft to land on another planet's surface.
 March 16 – NASA spacecraft Gemini 8 (David Scott, Neil Armstrong) conducts the first docking in space, with an Agena target vehicle.
 March 31 – The Soviet Union launches Luna 10 which later becomes the first spacecraft to enter orbit around the Moon.
 April 3 – Luna 10 is the first manmade object to enter lunar orbit.
 May 25 – Explorer program: Satellite Explorer 32 (Atmosphere Explorer-B) is launched from the United States.
 July 18 – Gemini 10 (John Young, Michael Collins) is launched from the United States. After docking with an Agena target vehicle, the astronauts then set a world altitude record of 474 miles (763 km).
 August 10 – Lunar Orbiter 1, the first U.S. spacecraft to orbit the Moon, is launched.
 November 17 – Notable display of the Leonids over the Americas.
 December 15 – Janus, one of the moons of Saturn, is identified by Audouin Dollfus (it had been first photographed on October 29).
 December 18 – Epimetheus, another of the moons of Saturn, is discovered, but mistaken for Janus which shares its orbit and they are not distinguished until 1978.
 Mullard Space Science Laboratory established in England.

Biology
 The first live specimen of a mountain pygmy possum (Burramys parvus), Australia's only truly hibernating marsupial, previously known only from the fossil record, is discovered.
 German entomologist Willi Hennig's Phylogenetic Systematics is published in English, advancing the study of cladistics.

Computer science
 September 1 – While waiting at a bus stop Ralph H. Baer, an inventor with Sanders Associates in the United States, writes a four-page document that lays out the basic principles for creating a video game to be played on a television: the beginning of a multibillion-dollar industry.
 Martin Richards designs the BCPL programming language.
 Roger MacGowan and Frederick Ordway first suggest the concept of machine superorganisms in Intelligence in the Universe.

Earth science
 Walter C. Pitman and James Heirtzler present the "magic" Eltanin marine magnetic anomaly profile that confirms the hypothesis of seafloor spreading at mid-ocean ridges.

Mathematics
 The Fabius function is published.
 Chen Jingrun publishes Chen's theorem: every sufficiently large even number can be written as the sum of a prime and a semiprime.
 David Mumford introduces Mumford–Tate groups.
 Euler's sum of powers conjecture is disproven by L. J. Lander and T. R. Parkin when, through a direct computer search on a CDC 6600, they have found the counterexample 275 + 845 + 1105 + 1335 = 1445. Their paper announcing the result is one of the shortest published scientific articles ever published.

Physiology and medicine
 April 21 – An artificial heart is installed in the chest of Marcel DeRudder in a Houston, Texas, hospital.
 Gynecologist John McLean Morris and biologist Gertrude Van Wagenen at the Yale School of Medicine report the successful use of oral high-dose estrogen pills for post-coital contraception in women and rhesus macaque monkeys respectively.
 Victor A. McKusick publishes the first edition of his catalogue of all known genes and genetic disorders, Mendelian Inheritance in Man.
 Long-term potentiation (LTP), the putative cellular mechanism of learning and memory, is first observed by Terje Lømo in Oslo, Norway.
 Andreas Rett first describes Rett syndrome.

Psychology
 Human Sexual Response is published by Masters and Johnson.
 On Aggression and Behind the Mirror are published by Konrad Lorenz.

Technology
 January – First proposals for optical fiber communication presented by Charles K. Kao with George Hockham.
 May 2 – Scottish inventor James Goodfellow obtains a UK patent for an automated teller machine using a plastic card and PIN.
 October 16 – The "Caspian Sea Monster" ground-effect vehicle first flies in the Soviet Union.
 Marie Van Brittan Brown originates the home security system in the United States.

Awards
 Fermi Prize – Lise Meitner and Otto Hahn
 Fields Medal in mathematics – Michael Atiyah, Paul Cohen, Alexander Grothendieck and Stephen Smale
 Nobel Prizes
 Physics – Alfred Kastler
 Chemistry – Robert S. Mulliken
 Medicine – Peyton Rous, Charles Brenton Huggins
 Turing Award – Alan Perlis

Births
 February 23 – Didier Queloz, Swiss astronomer.
 April 14 – Polina Bayvel, Ukrainian-born optical communications engineer.
 April 21 – Chris Whitty, English epidemiologist, Chief Medical Officer for England.
 May 17 – Adrian Owen, English neuroscientist.
 June 13 – Grigori Perelman, Russian mathematician.
 July 8 – Ralf Altmeyer, German virologist.
 August 7 – Jimmy Wales, American internet entrepreneur.
 September 10 – Carolyn Bertozzi, American winner of the Nobel Prize in Chemistry.
 September 30 – Shankar Balasubramanian, Indian-born British biochemist.
 October 30 – Irene Tracey, English neuroscientist and academic administrator.
 Undated – Victor Vescovo, American explorer.

Deaths
 January 15 – Sergei Korolev (born 1907), Soviet space scientist.
 March 1 – Fritz Houtermans (born 1903), Prussian-born Dutch physicist.
 March 12 – Sydney Camm (born 1893), English aircraft designer.
 March 26 – Anna Johnson Pell Wheeler (born 1883), American mathematician.
 June 20 – Monsignor Georges Lemaître (born 1894), Belgian physicist.
 July 7 – George de Hevesy (born 1885), Hungarian winner of the Nobel Prize in Chemistry.
 August 10 – Felix Andries Vening Meinesz (born 1887), Dutch geophysicist.
 October 1 – Mary Logan Reddick (born 1914), African American neuroembryologist.
 October 3 – Rolf Maximilian Sievert (born 1896), Swedish physicist.

References

 
20th century in science
1960s in science